was a Japanese samurai daimyō of the early Edo period. He was the head of Kumamoto Domain. He was a patron of the martial artist Miyamoto Musashi.

He married Chiyohime (1597–1649) daughter of Ogasawara Hidemasa and adopted daughter of the second Tokugawa shōgun, Hidetada. His childhood name was Mitsuchiyo (光千代).

Having studied the Yagyū Shinkage-ryū under Ujii Yashiro, Tadatoshi wanted his guest, Musashi, to fight against the sword master of his fief, and see which style was the strongest. But Ujii, despite his full license in Yagyu Shinkage style, could not strike a single blow against him after numerous bouts. Lord Tadatoshi took over, but he too was powerless against Musashi. He said then about Musashi: "I never imagined there could be such a difference in levels of accomplishment!"

Tadatoshi's grave is in Kumamoto. His grandfather was Hosokawa Fujitaka.

Family
 Father: Hosokawa Tadaoki
 Mother: Hosokawa Gracia
 Wife: Chiyohime (1597–1649)
 Children:
 Hosokawa Mitsunao by Chiyohime
 Fujihime married Matsudaira Tadahiro
 Hosokawa Munemoto
 daughter married Ariyoshi Hidenaga
 Hosokawa Naofusa
 Nanjo Mototomo (1641–1703)

Gallery

Ancestry

References

External links
Harris, Victor (1974). Introduction to A Book of Five Rings. New York: Overlook Press.

|-

1586 births
1641 deaths
Daimyo
Higo-Hosokawa clan
Deified Japanese people